Marlowe Sawyer is a fictional character in the television series Nip/Tuck. Marlowe Sawyer is portrayed by Peter Dinklage in the television series.

Character overview
A former nanny for Conor McNamara. He has dwarfism and is opposed to performing surgery on Conor, and as such is frequently at odds with Sean. He and Julia find a kindred bond, and they begin a brief affair. Asked Sean to give him leg enhancement surgery so he could be tall enough for Julia. Left during a hurricane in Miami to have a nice long vacation in Italy.

Character's background
After Sean secretly slept with Monica Wilder, a woman who applied to be his newborn son's nanny, he told her it wouldn't be appropriate if she worked for Sean and his wife Julia. Monica then called Julia, turning down the night nurse position for baby Conor. Julia then interviewed Marlowe Sawyer. Marlowe gave a touching speech, asking Julia to look into her son's eyes in the first moments of his birth. After giving birth to Conor, she then called Marlowe and hired him. Having a male nanny concerns Sean and Julia, but they eventually trust him. Marlowe has an affair with Julia, which shocks Sean because of Marlowe's dwarfism. She eventually tells Sean. When confronted by Sean, Marlowe says they have an attraction that goes further than just friends. Marlowe thinks that it's best that he leaves, and does.

Marlowe has a strong friendship with Conor. He is hired as a nanny to him and bonds too.

Future
In the episode "Conor McNamara 2026", it is learned Marlowe is married and has a child, that Conor requested him to be his godfather and the pair are very close.

References 

Nip/Tuck characters
Fictional nurses
Fictional nannies
Fictional artists
Fictional characters with dwarfism
Television characters introduced in 2006